Leslie Fernandez is a railway worker and former Indian national field hockey goalie. He served as a goalkeeper in the Indian national hockey team which won the gold medal in the 1975 Hockey World Cup.
and he was educated at Campion Anglo-Indian Higher Secondary School in Tiruchirappalli. He blocked Pakistan's winning goal in the final minutes of the game winning India a gold medal. In tribute, he donated it to the church. He lives in Madras currently with his family.

Notes

References 
 

Year of birth missing (living people)
Living people
Field hockey players from Tamil Nadu
Sportspeople from Tiruchirappalli
Asian Games medalists in field hockey
Field hockey players at the 1974 Asian Games
Indian male field hockey players
Asian Games silver medalists for India
Medalists at the 1974 Asian Games
Recipients of the Arjuna Award